Rakhwala may refer to:

 Rakhwala (1971 film), a 1971 Bollywood musical film
 Rakhwala (1989 film)
 Rakhwala (2013 film), an Indian Bhojpuri film